Jonathan Monaghan (born September 14, 1986 in Rockaway Beach, Queens, New York) is a contemporary visual artist who uses computer animation software to create his work.  He received his BFA in computer graphics from the New York Institute of Technology. Monaghan then went on to receive a MFA from the University of Maryland.

Career
Monaghan's animations have been exhibited at The Phillips Collection, the Sundance Film Festival and the Palais de Tokyo. His work has been reviewed in the Washington Post  and the Village Voice. Monaghan's work sits in numerous public and private collections such as The DC Commission on the Arts and Humanities and The Crystal Bridges Museum of American Art.

Monaghan is represented by bitforms gallery in New York.

Exhibitions

Solo
 "After Fabergé" The Walters Art Museum, Baltimore
 "Gotham" 22,48m2, Paris
 "Disco Beast" bitforms gallery, New York
 "Escape Pod" bitforms gallery, New York
 "Robot Ninja" Market Gallery, Glasgow

Select screenings
 LOOP Barcelona, Barcelona, Spain
 Boston Underground Film Festival, Boston MA
 Hirshhorn Museum - "Experimental Media Series" Washington D.C.
 International Film Festival Rotterdam, Rotterdam Netherlands

References

External links
 
 Jonathan Monaghan on Vimeo
 bitforms gallery, NYC

1986 births
Living people
American animators
University of Maryland, College Park alumni